The 2010–11 Big Ten Conference men's basketball season marks the continuation of the annual tradition of competitive basketball among Big Ten Conference members that began in 1904.  The non-conference portion of the 2010–11 NCAA Division I men's basketball season began on November 8, 2010 with Illinois defeating UC Irvine in the opening round of the 2010 Coaches Vs. Cancer Classic. Conference play is set to begin on December 27, 2010 with Penn State traveling to play Indiana in Bloomington, Indiana.  Following conference play, Conseco Fieldhouse in Indianapolis will host the 2011 Big Ten Conference men's basketball tournament to be played Thursday, March 10 through Sunday, March 13.  The Big Ten Conference will host second and third round games of the 2011 NCAA Men's Division I Basketball Tournament at the United Center in Chicago March 18 and 20, 2011.

The Big Ten had seven teams invited to the 68-team 2011 NCAA Men's Division I Basketball Tournament (NCAA tournament) and one team invited to the 2011 National Invitation Tournament (NIT).  Ohio State was a number one seed and along with Wisconsin survived until the Sweet Sixteen round.  No Big Ten teams made the elite eight and the Big Ten finished with a 7–7 record in the tournament. Northwestern made the elite eight round of the 32-team NIT before being eliminated.

JaJuan Johnson was the regular season MVP and Jared Sullinger was the 2011 Big Ten Conference men's basketball tournament MVP.  Both earned first team recognition as 2011 NCAA Men's Basketball All-Americans and Sullinger earned numerous National Freshman of the Year Awards. The conference led the nation in attendance for the 35th straight season with a 12,826 overall average and 7 of the top 25 schools.

Preseason
Seventeen members of the 2009-10 All-Conference teams returned, including five players who earned first-team honors over the prior two seasons and a previous Big Ten Player of the Year.  Eight career 1,000-points scorers, including two 1,500-point scorers returned. Fourteen of the conference's top scorers and rebounders in all games played from last season, including five of the top 10 of each category returned. Eight players that led the conference in a statistical category last season for all games played also returned.

The Big Ten media panel announced that they selected Michigan State, Ohio State and Purdue as the preseason media day selections.  They also announced the 2010–11 All-Big Ten Conference first-team selections: Kalin Lucas MSU, Demetri McCamey ILL, E'Twaun Moore PUR, Jon Leuer WIS, and JaJuan Johnson PUR. Lucas repeated as the preseason conference player of the year.

Preseason watchlists
On October 4, 2010, the Wooden Award preseason watch list included eight Big Ten players. The watchlist was composed of 50 players who were not transfers, freshmen or medical redshirts.  The list will be reduced to a 30-player mid-season watchlist in December and a final national ballot of about 20 players in March. The Naismith College Player of the Year watchlist of 50 players was announced on November 16, 2010.  In late February, a shorter list of the Top 30 will be compiled in preparation for a March vote to narrow the list to the four finalists.

Lauer, Moore, Minnesota's Blake Hoffarber, and Ohio State's David Lighty were named as candidates for the Lowe's Senior CLASS Award.

Rankings

The Big Ten Conference entered the season with five teams ranked in the USA Today/ESPN Preseason Top 25 Men's Basketball Coaches' Poll.

Preconference schedules

Tournaments
Big Ten teams emerged victorious in the following tournament:

ACC–Big Ten Challenge

Player of the week
Players of the week
Throughout the conference regular season, the Big Ten offices named a player of the week each Monday.

Honors and accolades
On February 3, 2011, Michigan's Zack Novak (District 4), Northwestern's Drew Crawford (District 5) and Minnesota's Blake Hoffarber (District 5) were selected by CoSIDA as among the forty Academic All-District players, making them finalists for fifteen Academic All-American selections later in the month. Hoffarber was named as a second team Academic All-American. The conference also had 37 Academic All-Conference Team selections.

Jared Sullinger and JaJuan Johnson were among the ten finalists for the Oscar Robertson Trophy. Demetri McCamey, Sullinger, Johnson E'Twaun Moore and Jon Leuer were Naismith Award Midseason Top 30 List selections. McCamey and Jordan Taylor are Bob Cousy Award finalists. Sullinger was among the five finalists for the Wayman Tisdale Award. Moore, Leuer and David Lighty were selected among the ten Lowe's Senior CLASS Award finalists.

Conference honors
Two sets of conference award winners were recognized by the Big Ten - one selected by league coaches and one selected by the media.

NABC
The National Association of Basketball Coaches announced their Division I All-District teams on March 9, recognizing the nation's best men's collegiate basketball student-athletes. Selected and voted on by member coaches of the NABC, 245 student-athletes, from 24 districts were chosen. The selection on this list were then eligible for the State Farm Coaches' Division I All-America teams. The following list represented the Big Ten players chosen to the list. Since the Big Ten Conference was its own district, this is equivalent to being named All-Big Ten by the NABC.

First Team
JaJuan Johnson Purdue
Jared Sullinger Ohio State
Jordan Taylor Wisconsin
Jon Leuer Wisconsin
Talor Battle Penn State
Second Team
E'Twaun Moore Purdue
William Buford Ohio State
David Lighty Ohio State
Darius Morris Michigan
Trevor Mbakwe Minnesota

USBWA
On March 10, the U.S. Basketball Writers Association released its 2010–11 Men's All-District Teams, based on voting from its national membership. There were nine regions from coast to coast, and a player and coach of the year were selected in each. The following lists all the Big Ten representatives selected within their respective regions.

District II (NY, NJ, DE, DC, PA, WV)
Talor Battle, Penn State
District V (OH, IN, IL, MI, MN, WI)
Player of the Year
JaJuan Johnson, Purdue
Coach of the Year
Matt Painter, Purdue
All-District Team
JaJuan Johnson, Purdue
Jon Leuer, Wisconsin
Kalin Lucas, Michigan State
Demetri McCamey, Illinois
E'Twaun Moore, Purdue
Jared Sullinger, Ohio State
Jordan Taylor, Wisconsin
District VI (IA, MO, KS, OK, NE, ND, SD)
None Selected

National postseason honors
Jordan Taylor, Jon Leuer, Jared Sullinger, JaJuan Johnson, E'Twaun Moore were among the 20 players on the final ballot for the John R. Wooden Award.

Johnson and Sullinger were named first team 2011 NCAA Men's Basketball All-Americans by the United States Basketball Writers Association (USBWA).  They were also first team selections by Sporting News and Associated Press who also selected Jordan Taylor to their second teams.  The National Association of Basketball Coaches named Johnson and Sullinger to its first team and Taylor and Moore to its third team.  The Associated Press named Talor Battle, Jon Leuer, and E'Twaun Moore as honorable mention selections.

Sullinger won the Wayman Tisdale Award as the USBWA's National Freshman of the Year and Sporting News' Freshman of the Year.  Sullinger, Aaron Craft, Jereme Richmond and Tim Hardaway Jr. were among the 21 players selected to the 2011 Collegeinsider.com Freshmen All-America team.

Following the season four players were invited to the June 17 – 24, 2011 17-man tryouts for the 12-man FIBA Under-19 World Championship team by USA Basketball: Hardaway (UofM), Keith Appling (MSU), Melsahn Basabe (Iowa) and Meyers Leonard (Ill.). The 12 selected players will compete as Team USA in the 2011 FIBA U19 World Championships in Latvia from June 30 – July 10, 2011.  Appling, Hardaway and Leonard made the final roster.

Matt Painter coached Team USA to a 5th-place finish in the 2011 World University Games.  The team included Trevor Mbakwe and Draymond Green.

Postseason

Big Ten tournament

NCAA tournament

National Invitation tournament

Other tournaments

The Big Ten did not have any entrants in the other post season tournaments.

2011 NBA draft

The following All-Big Ten performers were listed as seniors: JaJuan Johnson, E'Twaun Moore, Talor Battle, David Lighty, Jon Leuer, Demetri McCamey, Jon Diebler, and  Michael Thompson
Darius Morris has sought the advice of the NBA's undergraduate advisory committee to determine his draft prospects. On May 4, Morris announced his final decision not to withdraw his name prior to the May 8 deadline and to enter the June 23, 2011 NBA draft.
The following were Big Ten underclassmen, who declared early for the 2011 draft: Darius Morris, Jereme Richmond, Ralph Sampson III, John Shurna.
The following were Big Ten underclassmen who entered their name in the draft but who did not hire agents and opted to return to college:Ralph Sampson III & John Shurna.

A total of five Big Ten players were selected in the 2011 NBA draft.

Notes

External links
Big Ten website
Men's basketball at Big Ten Network
Big Ten Media Guide